Sepp Weiss (born 13 March 1952) is a German footballer who played for Bayern Munich and was part of their European Cup victory in 1975.

Weiss made 37 appearances in the Bundesliga for Bayern Munich before moving to Würzburger FV and SpVgg Bayreuth where he would make 104 appearances in the 2. Bundesliga.

Honours

Club
Bayern Munich
 European Cup: 1974–75
 Intercontinental Cup: 1976

References

1953 births
Living people
German footballers
FC Bayern Munich footballers
FC Bayern Munich II players
Bundesliga players
Association football midfielders
UEFA Champions League winning players
People from Freising
Sportspeople from Upper Bavaria
Footballers from Bavaria
West German footballers
German football managers